Tero Heikki Mainio Lehtovaara (19 April 1937 – 29 May 2017) was a Finnish diplomat, and law student with a law degree.

Lehtovaara was a Finnish Ambassador to Havana from 1983 to 1987, Deputy Director of the Press and Culture Department from the Ministry for Foreign Affairs from 1988 to 1989 and Ambassador to Kuwait from 1989 to 1992 and to Abu Dhabi from 1989 to 1991 and the Foreign Affairs Counselor since 1992 after he retired.

Lehtovaara was born in Turku, and obtained his undergraduate degree from the Finnish Normal Lyceum in 1955. He graduated as a Bachelor of Law in 1960. Lehtovaara's spouse since 1960 was Marjatta (née Sallinen). His parents were PhD Juuso Mainio Lehtovaara and Pharmacist Helga Soveig (née  Allén). He died in  Porvoo, aged 80.

References 

1937 births
2017 deaths
People from Turku
Ambassadors of Finland to Cuba
Ambassadors of Finland to Kuwait
Ambassadors of Finland to the United Arab Emirates